During the 2015–16 season, Elitserien, the top league of Swedish men's handball, contained 14 teams. The championship was won by IFK Kristianstad.

Teams

The following 14 teams compete in Elitserien in the 2015–16 season. HIF Karlskrona and HK Aranäs were promoted from 2014–15 Allsvenskan. Önnereds HK were relegated from the previous season whereas H 43 Lund left Elitserien during the 2014–15 season due to bankruptcy.

Standings

Play-offs

Attendance

External links
Official website

References 

2015–16 domestic handball leagues
2015–16
2015 in Swedish sport
2016 in Swedish sport